Weston as a surname may refer to:

 Alf Weston, rugby league footballer of the 1970s
 Anthony Weston, philosopher and author
 Arthur Weston (priest), Australian Anglican priest
 Aylmer Hunter-Weston (1864–1940), British general and politician
 Bob Weston, American musician
 Bob Weston (guitarist) (1947–2012), English guitarist
 Brett Weston (1911–1993), American photographer
 Charles Weston (disambiguation), several people
 Curtis Weston (born 1987), English footballer
 Daniel Weston (born 1983), German cricketer
 David Weston (disambiguation), several people
 Denny Weston Jr., American drummer, composer, and songwriter
 Doug Weston (c. 1926/27–1999), American nightclub owner
 Dwain Weston (1973–2003), Australian skydiver
 Edward Weston (disambiguation), several people
 Ezra Weston II (1772–1842), American shipbuilder, also known as King Caesar
 Sir Francis Weston (c. 1513 – 1536), English royal attendant
 Galen Weston (1940–2021), Canadian businessman, son of W.G. Weston
 Galen Weston, Jr. (born 1972), son of Galen Weston and head of Loblaws
 Garry Weston (born 1961), Canadian born British businessman, son of W.G. Weston
 George Weston (1864–1924), founder of Weston Bakeries
 George Weston (physicist) (1925–2009), English physicist
 George G. Weston (born 1964), British businessman, son of Garry Weston
 Guy Weston (born 1960), British businessman, son of Garry Weston
 Harold Weston (1894–1972), American modernist painter 
 Harry Weston (1928–2008), British basketball player, brother of Stanley
 Harry J. Weston (1874–1955), Australian painter
 Hilary Weston (born 1942), Irish-born Canadian businesswoman and politician 
 Jack Weston (1924–1996), American actor
 James A. Weston (1827–1895), American politician
 Jerome Weston, 2nd Earl of Portland (c. 1605 – 1662), English nobleman
 Jessie Weston (scholar) (1850–1928), British writer on Arthurian legend
Jessie Weston (writer) (1867–1939), New Zealand novelist and journalist
 Joan Weston (1935–1997), American roller derby athlete
 John Weston (disambiguation), several people
 Sir Joseph Dodge Weston (1822–1895), English merchant, shipping magnate and politician
 Kathy Weston (born 1958), American middle-distance runner
 Kim Weston (born 1939), American soul singer
 Kris Weston (born 1972), British electronic musician
 Leslie Weston (1896–1975), British actor
 Dame Margaret Weston (1926–2021), British museum director
 Maria Weston Chapman (1806–1885), American abolitionist 
 Michael Weston (born 1973), American actor
 Mildred Weston (1892-1975) American author and composer
 Neville Weston (1936–2017), English Australian artist and art historian
 Pamela Weston (1921–2009), British clarinettist
 Paul Weston (1912–1996), American music arranger
 Paul Weston (disambiguation), several people
 Percy Weston (1852–1905), played football for England in 1871 and 1872
 Peter Weston (1943–2017), English businessman and organizer of science fiction symposia
 Phil Weston (born 1973), English cricketer
 Randy Weston (1926–2018), American jazz pianist 
 Rhys Weston (born 1980), Welsh footballer
 Richard Weston (disambiguation), several people
 Riley Weston (born 1967), American actress
 Roswell Weston (1774–1861), New York politician and judge
 Roz Weston (born 1974), Canadian television personality
 R. P. Weston (1878–1936), English songwriter
 Russell Eugene Weston Jr. (born 1956), American murderer, of the United States Capitol shooting incident (1998)
 Samuel Weston (died 1716), English politician
 Simon Weston (born 1961), Welsh soldier and Falkland Islands veteran
 Stanley Weston né Weinburger (1919–2002), American sports magazine publisher
 Stanley Weston (basketball) (1923–2000), British basketballer, brother of Harry
 Stephen Weston (1665–1742), English bishop and educator
 Stephen Weston (F.R.S.) (1747–1830), English linguist, poet, and translator
 Steve Weston (died 1985), Canadian actor
 Thomas Weston (disambiguation), several people
 Tim Weston (born 1982), New Zealand cricketer
 Tommy Weston (1895–1952), English footballer who played for Aston Villa and Stoke City
 Tony Weston (footballer, born 1946), English footballer
 Tony Weston (footballer, born 2003), English footballer
 W. Garfield Weston (1898–1978), Canadian businessman and former British MP
 Walter Weston (1861–1940), English clergyman and mountaineer
 William Weston (disambiguation), several people

Fictional characters
 Anne Weston, a character in the Jane Austen novel Emma
 Devin Weston, a character in the 2013 video game Grand Theft Auto V
 Professor Weston, fictional C.S. Lewis character 
 Sir Weston, the 21st ghost Luigi encounters in Luigi's Mansion
 Levi Weston, protagonist in Power Rangers Ninja Steel

See also
 Weston family
 Weston (disambiguation)
 Westons (disambiguation)

English-language surnames

cs:Weston
Surnames of English origin